Hamberg Glacier is a glacier which flows in an east-northeasterly direction from the northeast side of Mount Sugartop to the west side of the head of Moraine Fjord, South Georgia. It was charted by the Swedish Antarctic Expedition, 1901–04, under Otto Nordenskiöld, who named it for Axel Hamberg, a Swedish geographer, mineralogist and Arctic explorer.

See also
 List of glaciers in the Antarctic
 Glaciology

References

External links

Glaciers of South Georgia